The  is a suspension bridge in Muroran, Hokkaido, Japan. It is the first section of the Hakuchō Shindō that is signed as an alternate route of Japan National Route 37.

Several windmills line the bridge which provide lighting at night to the park golf link nearby. The winds are extremely high on the bridge, so pedestrians, bikes, and motorbikes are prohibited from crossing.

See also
List of longest suspension bridge spans

References

External links 
 

Suspension bridges in Japan
Bridges completed in 1998
Muroran, Hokkaido